A Centennial Trail is either a trail created to celebrate a centennial, or the memorialization of a path or trail that has endured for a century. These can be, but are not necessarily, rail trails.

Centennial Trails in the United States 
 Centennial Trail - South Dakota
 Centennial Trail - Illinois
 North Idaho Centennial Trail - Idaho
 Snohomish County Centennial Trail - Washington
 Spokane River Centennial Trail - Washington

Centennial Trails in Canada
 Centennial Trail (Manitoba) - Whiteshell Provincial Park

See also
 Centennial Trail (disambiguation)

Road infrastructure